Dark Town is a comic book by Canadian cartoonist Kaja Blackley. It was illustrated by Vanessa Chong and published by Mad Monkey Press.

Plot
A man, Jacques De Bergerac, is in a coma after being in a car accident. He finds himself in Dark Town, where the land is dominated by strange living, breathing puppets and marionettes with button eyes.

The Lords of Dark Town are trying to kill Jacques, and use his body in the real world as a vessel for an agent of Dark Town. There's only one problem: Jacques' imagination. He carries it with him always, in a red suitcase. It protects him from the horrors of Dark Town.

Meanwhile, in the real world, Jacques' wife decides to take him off life support. Jacques now only has 12 hours to live. Back in Dark Town, Jacques encounters Death, who informs him of his time limit, and tells him how to escape Dark Town. The book ends on a cliff-hanger, as Jacques is captured by a knight after wandering onto a chessboard.

Film adaptation
Dark Town was the basis for the film Monkeybone.

Continuation
Dark Town was originally intended to be a miniseries.
However, only the first part of the story was ever published.

Notes

References

Canadian comics
Canadian graphic novels
1995 graphic novels
1995 comics debuts
Fantasy comics
Horror comics
Canadian comics adapted into films
Fictional locations in comics